Richard Sindani (born June 23, 1995) is a Canadian professional gridiron football wide receiver for the New Orleans Breakers of the United States Football League (USFL). He is a Grey Cup champion after winning the 106th Grey Cup with the Stampeders. He played college football for the Regina Rams and Calgary Dinos and also played in the Canadian Junior Football League with the Calgary Colts.

Early career

Regina Rams
Sindani played CIS football for the Regina Rams from 2013 to 2015 where he played in 20 regular season games. With the Rams, he recorded 33 receptions for 467 yards and three touchdowns.

Calgary Colts
In 2016, Sindani played for the Calgary Colts of the Canadian Junior Football League. He played in eight games and caught 31 passes for 414 yards and two touchdowns.

Calgary Dinos
Sindani transferred back to university football to play for the Calgary Dinos in 2017. With the Dinos, he played in six regular season games and had 23 receptions for 280 yards and one touchdown. He also played in the Dinos' Hardy Cup victory over the UBC Thunderbirds that year.

Professional career

Calgary Stampeders
Sindani was drafted in the eighth round, 70th overall, by the Calgary Stampeders in the 2017 CFL Draft and signed with the team on May 18, 2017. He played in two pre-season games for the Stampeders before going back to university football to play for the Calgary Dinos. 

Sindani re-signed with the Stampeders on February 9, 2018. He made the team following training camp and dressed in his first professional game in the team's 2018 season opener on June 16, 2018 against the Hamilton Tiger-Cats. In that game, he also had his first career reception on a 13-yard catch. In total, he played in all 18 regular season games where he had eight receptions for 107 yards. The Stampeders finished in first place and Sindani played in his first post-season game, the West Final, where he had three catches for 44 yards in a Calgary victory. He then played in his first Grey Cup which was a Stampeder win over the Ottawa Redblacks in the 2018 championship game.

In 2019, Sindani's role in the Calgary offence grew as he played in fewer games (15), but had 32 catches for 362 yards that year. He earned his first career professional start at receiver on July 18, 2019 in a win over the Toronto Argonauts. He missed three games in September due to injury. He also played in the Stampeders' West Semi-Final loss to the Winnipeg Blue Bombers.

Sindani was scheduled for free agency in 2021, but decided to remain with Stampeders and was signed to a contract extension on January 22, 2021. He scored this first career touchdown on September 17, 2021 in a game against the Hamilton Tiger-Cats on a five-yard reception from Jake Maier. He played in all 14 regular season games where he had 26 catches for 262 yards and two touchdowns.

In the opening game of the 2022 season, on June 9, 2022, against the Montreal Alouettes, Sindani had a career high in both receptions and receiving yards as he had seven catches for 101 yards (his first 100-yard game) and led the team in both categories. On February 14, 2023, Sindani was released by the Stampeders.

New Orleans Breakers
On February 15, 2023, Sindani signed with the New Orleans Breakers of the United States Football League (USFL).

References

External links
 Calgary Stampeders bio

1995 births
Living people
Canadian football wide receivers
Canadian Junior Football League players
Calgary Dinos football players
Calgary Stampeders players
Players of Canadian football from Saskatchewan
Regina Rams players
Sportspeople from Regina, Saskatchewan
New Orleans Breakers (2022) players